Maaykuyak is a genus of scorpions in the family Vaejovidae, found in Mexico and the United States (Texas).

Species 
Currently accepted species include:
 Maaykuyak vittatus (Williams, 1970)
 Maaykuyak waueri (Gertsch & Soleglad, 1972)

References

Vaejovidae
Scorpion genera